The 2018 season was the 16th season of competitive kickboxing in Romania.

List of events

Fighters League 2

Fighters League 2 was a kickboxing event produced by the Fighters League that took place on January 27, 2018, at the Sala Polivalentă in Reșița, Romania.

Results

Colosseum Tournament 5

Colosseum Tournament 5 was a kickboxing event produced by the Colosseum Tournament that took place on February 23, 2018, at the Patinoarul Dunărea in Galați, Romania.

Results

SUPERKOMBAT Dream

SUPERKOMBAT Dream was a kickboxing event produced by the Superkombat Fighting Championship that took place on March 25, 2018, at the Magic Place in Bucharest, Romania.

Results

Colosseum Tournament 6

Colosseum Tournament 6 was a kickboxing event produced by the Colosseum Tournament that took place on April 20, 2018, at the Sala Polivalentă in Iaşi, Romania.

Results

OSS Fighters 01

OSS Fighters 01 was a kickboxing event produced by the OSS Fighters that took place on April 20, 2018, at the Sala Sporturilor in Constanța, Romania.

Results

GFC 4

GFC 4 (also known as  Bulgaria vs. Romania) was a kickboxing event produced by the Golden Fighter Championship that took place on April 28, 2018, at the Varna Palace in Varna, Bulgaria.

Fight card

Colosseum Tournament 7

Colosseum Tournament 7 was a kickboxing event produced by the Colosseum Tournament that took place on May 24, 2018, at the Sala Polivalentă in Bucharest, Romania.

Results

Dynamite Fighting Show 1

Dynamite Fighting Show 1 (also known as  Moroșanu vs. Kemayo) was a combat sport event produced by the Dynamite Fighting Show that took place on July 5, 2018, at the Sala Polivalentă in Bucharest, Romania.

Results

Awards
Performance of the Night: Bogdan Năstase

ACB KB 16

ACB KB 16 (also known as  Clash of Titans) was a kickboxing event produced by the ACB that took place on July 13, 2018, at the Unirii Plaza in Târgoviște, Romania.

Fight card

OSS Fighters 02/GFC 5

OSS Fighters 02/GFC 5 (also known as  Romania vs. China II) was a kickboxing event produced by the OSS Fighters and the Golden Fighter Championship, and co-promoted with Wu Lin Feng. It took place on August 24, 2018, at the Piațeta Cazino in Mamaia, Romania.

Fight card

Colosseum Tournament 8

Colosseum Tournament 8 was a kickboxing event produced by the Colosseum Tournament that took place on September 17, 2018, at the Sala Polivalentă in Bucharest, Romania.

Results

APP Fight Night 01

APP Fight Night 01 was a kickboxing event produced by the APP Fighting Promotion that took place on October 8, 2018, at the Hotel Lux Divina in Brașov, Romania.

Results

Dynamite Fighting Show 2

Dynamite Fighting Show 2 (also known as  Battle of Moldavia) was a kickboxing and kyokushin event produced by the Dynamite Fighting Show that took place on October 19, 2018, at the Sala Polivalentă in Piatra Neamț, Romania. The event was sold out.

Results

Awards
Fight of the Night: Florin Lambagiu vs. Alexandru Radnev

Colosseum Tournament 9

Colosseum Tournament 9 (also known as  Ghiță vs. Poturak) was a kickboxing event produced by the Colosseum Tournament that took place on October 29, 2018, at the BTarena in Cluj-Napoca, Romania.

Results

SAS Gym 01

SAS Gym 01 was a kickboxing event produced by the SAS Gym that took place on November 2, 2018, at the SAS Gym in Bucharest, Romania.

Results

Dynamite Fighting Show 3

Dynamite Fighting Show 3 (also known as  Oltenia burns) was a combat sport event produced by the Dynamite Fighting Show that took place on December 14, 2018, at the Sala Polivalentă in Craiova, Romania.

Results

Awards
Fight of the Night: Ciprian Șchiopu vs. Ionuț Iancu

Colosseum Tournament 10

Colosseum Tournament 10 was a kickboxing event produced by the Colosseum Tournament that took place on December 14, 2018, at the Sala Constantin Jude in Timișoara, Romania.

Results

See also
 2018 in Glory
 2018 in K-1
 2018 in Kunlun Fight
 2018 in ONE Championship
 2018 in Glory of Heroes

References

External links
 Dynamitefighting.com
 Colosseumkickboxing.com
 OSS Fighters on Facebook
 Golden Fighter Championship on Facebook

Kickboxing
2018 in kickboxing
2018 in mixed martial arts
2018 in boxing
Kickboxing in Romania